Mikel Aristi Gardoki (born 28 May 1993 in Bergara, Spain) is a Spanish former cyclist, who competed as a professional from 2013 to 2022.

Major results
2014
 1st Stage 1 (TTT) Tour de Gironde
2015
 1st Vuelta a Toledo
 1st Stage 2 Volta a Coruña
 1st Stage 2 Vuelta a Cantabria
2017
 1st Stage 1 La Tropicale Amissa Bongo
 6th Gran Premio della Costa Etruschi
2018
 7th Tro-Bro Léon
2019
 1st Stage 2 Volta a Portugal
 4th Overall Tour du Limousin
1st Stage 2
2021
 2nd Clàssica Comunitat Valenciana 1969
 2nd Per sempre Alfredo

References

External links

 
 
 

1993 births
Living people
Cyclists from the Basque Country (autonomous community)
People from Bergara
Sportspeople from Gipuzkoa
Spanish male cyclists